The 2012 Shimizu S-Pulse season was Shimizu S-Pulse's 20th consecutive season in J.League Division 1. Shimizu S-Pulse also competed in the 2012 Emperor's Cup and 2012 J.League Cup.

Players

Competitions

J. League

League table

Matches

J. League Cup

Emperor's Cup

References

Shimizu S-Pulse
Shimizu S-Pulse seasons